Eilema vicara is a moth of the subfamily Arctiinae. It was described by Strand in 1922. It is found in the Democratic Republic of Congo, Rwanda and South Africa.

References

 Natural History Museum Lepidoptera generic names catalog

vicara
Moths described in 1922